Ai Yanhan (born 7 February 2002) is a Chinese competitive swimmer who specializes in freestyle.

She qualified for the 2016 Summer Olympics in Rio de Janeiro in the 200 meter freestyle. She swam the 8th time in the heats (1:56.77) and qualified for the semifinals, where she was eliminated with an 11th place.

References

External links
 

2002 births
Living people
Chinese female freestyle swimmers
Olympic swimmers of China
Swimmers at the 2016 Summer Olympics
Swimmers at the 2020 Summer Olympics
Swimmers from Wuhan
World Aquatics Championships medalists in swimming
Asian Games medalists in swimming
Asian Games gold medalists for China
Swimmers at the 2018 Asian Games
Medalists at the 2018 Asian Games
Medalists at the FINA World Swimming Championships (25 m)